Spencer Austen-Leigh (17 February 1834 – 9 December 1913) was an English cricketer. Austen-Leigh was a right-handed batsman, although his bowling style is not known. He was born at Speen, Berkshire, and was educated at Harrow School. His name changed from Spencer Austen to Spencer Austen-Leigh in 1837. He was the great-nephew of the author Jane Austen.

Austen-Leigh made his first-class debut for the Gentlemen of England against the Gentlemen of Sussex and Kent at Lord's in 1857. The following season he made a single first-class appearance for the Marylebone Cricket Club against Oxford University at the Magdalen Ground, Oxford. Two years later, he made a first-class appearance for the Gentlemen of the Marylebone Cricket Club against the Gentlemen of Kent at the St Lawrence Ground. In 1862, Austen-Leigh made his debut for Sussex against Kent at the Royal Brunswick Ground. He made nine further first-class appearances for Sussex, the last of which came against the Marylebone Cricket Club in 1866. In his ten first-class matches for the county, he scored 155 runs at an average of 11.07, with a high score of 42.

He died at Firle, Sussex, on 9 December 1913. His brothers, Arthur, Cholmeley and Charles, all played first-class cricket. Another brother, Augustus, was a Provost of King's College, Cambridge.

References

External links
Spencer Austen-Leigh at ESPNcricinfo
Spencer Austen-Leigh at CricketArchive

1834 births
1913 deaths
Austen family
Jane Austen
People from Speen, Berkshire
People educated at Harrow School
English cricketers
Marylebone Cricket Club cricketers
Sussex cricketers
Gentlemen of England cricketers
Gentlemen of Marylebone Cricket Club cricketers
Austen, Spencer
People from Firle